Chen Yueling (born December 24, 1969 (also reported as April 1, 1968) in Liaoning, China) is now an American race walker, who became the first ever female Olympic Race walking champion in 1992 while competing for China.  She was virtually tied with former Soviet, Unified Team member Alina Ivanova with 200 meters to go.  Ivanova then accelerated past Chen to the finish, while Chen held form.  After a short celebration, Ivanova earned a disqualification, while Chen was awarded her gold medal.

She had done mountain climbing and long-distance running before she started training at the Tieling Sports School in 1985. Spotted by Chinese walking coach Wang Kui, she joined the Liaoning provincial walking team. In 1989 she won the Asian Championships in New Delhi.

She also won the 1990 Asian Games and took silver at the 1991 Universiade.
She left China for the United States in 1994.

She competed for her new country at the 2000 Olympics, finishing 38th.

She has been active in charitable activities in the United States and has done professional modeling. As of 2001, she was employed as Director of Asian Marketing for the health and nutritional company, Imagenetix, Inc,.

Achievements

References

External links

Profile - China Daily
Official website

1969 births
Living people
American female racewalkers
Chinese female racewalkers
Olympic track and field athletes of the United States
Olympic athletes of China
Olympic gold medalists for China
Athletes (track and field) at the 1992 Summer Olympics
Athletes (track and field) at the 2000 Summer Olympics
Asian Games gold medalists for China
Asian Games medalists in athletics (track and field)
Athletes (track and field) at the 1990 Asian Games
People from Tieling
Athletes from Liaoning
Medalists at the 1992 Summer Olympics
Olympic gold medalists in athletics (track and field)
Universiade medalists in athletics (track and field)
Medalists at the 1990 Asian Games
Universiade silver medalists for China
Medalists at the 1991 Summer Universiade
21st-century American women